Apostolos Nikolaidis (30 June 1938 – 22 April 1999) was a Greek singer whose career spanned four decades. He was born in Drama, Greece and grew up in Thessaloniki. He is best known for being the first Greek artist to record or re-record the authentic, "prohibited" rebetika songs in the early 1970s with their original lyrics at a time when this type of music was censored in Greece due to the military junta of 1967–1974 in power.

Biography 
Nikolaidis was of Pontic Greek origin. He first appeared on the Greek music scene in 1962, recording songs written by composers such as Manolis Chiotis, Apostolos Kaldaras, and Vassilis Tsitsanis at the famed Greek record label Columbia. Throughout the 1960s, he performed at well-known venues in Athens with many of the pre-eminent music figures of the time including Stelios Kazantzidis, Marinella, Poly Panou, Kaiti Grey, Manolis Chiotis, Apostolos Kaldaras, Giorgos Lafkas, Giannis Karabesinis, and others.

In 1968, Nikolaidis departed for Canada and the United States for a series of performances, ultimately living and working in the U.S. for more than 25 years. The prohibited rebetika (Greek "urban blues") songs he recorded and released in his adopted country in the early 1970s became his life's work, making him popular in Greek diaspora communities around the world. The long-play album "Otan Kapnizi O Loulas" (1973) became an artistic and commercial achievement for Nikolaidis, as well as an impetus for other artists and groups to follow with similar recordings of their own. About the album's impact, Cypriot journalist Nearchos Georgiades wrote: “It is to his credit that he brought these songs back first, and to a large extent to the [Greek music] catalogue, with an inimitable ‘tough’ style and color in his voice, while simultaneously giving them a contemporary sound."

During the 1970s and 1980s, Nikolaidis recorded and released a series of classic laïká and rebetika albums and embarked on tours throughout the United States, Canada, and Germany. He returned to his native Greece during the 1990s and performed on stages in Athens, Thessaloniki and Cyprus through the end of the decade. In 1996 and 1997, Nikolaidis released two albums with music by laïká composer Giorgos Manisalis.

Apostolos Nikolaidis died on 22 April 1999, in Athens from complications from cancer. In accordance with his wishes, his remains were flown back to the United States and buried there.

In March 2022, a new book in Greek and English titled "Apostolos Nikolaidis: The Authentic Laïká Singer Who Was Never Censored" was announced by Marilou Press. On 6 June 2022, the book received a highly positive review from popular Greek news and culture website LiFO.gr. In its February 2023 review, American book publishing website BookLife called it “an entertaining mixed-media celebration of an epochal Greek musician”.

Reviews
In 2007, Chris Williams of fRoots magazine wrote: "Nikolaidis's musical development and style – the tough urban manner, always serious and dignified, never descending into skyladika – was hugely influenced by his social background: he began his working life as a construction worker in an age when such labourers were the vanguard of the politicised working class, rather as the miners once were in the UK. In this and much else he had a lot in common with Stelios Kazantzidis, whom he greatly admired and whose singing clearly influenced him." 

About Nikolaidis's singing quality and style, Georgiades wrote the same year: "His voice is clear and manly, with its own particular flavour and superbly articulated, extending over two whole octaves without fading in the lower notes or straining at the higher ones…he is assisted by the correct breathing and the capacity of his lungs, which help him to extend his hold on the note in the final phrases. His pronunciation of consonants and especially of the vowels, tinged with his particular brand of “toughness” and sarcasm, serve to establish the distinctive ‘Nikolaidis style’."

Journalist Panos Geramanis, a leading authority on the laïká musical style's golden era, wrote in 1999: "Apostolos Nikolaidis was the man, the artist who gave new life to the rebetiko at a time when it was considered to be in decline and its creators and interpreters were officially hunted down by the state as hashish smokers and people of the underworld. Nikolaidis presented and interpreted these rebetika, pushed-aside songs with such "coolness" they made a huge impression. Soon afterward, the first "Rebetic [Music] Company" started to slowly incorporate them into their repertoire, followed by many other singers popular today."

Discography

1961–1967 (45RPM Singles)

1969–1983 (33RPM Albums)
O Gialinos Kosmos (1969)
Otan Kapnizi O Loulas (1973)
O Arhagelos (1975)
Ithela Namouna Pasas (1976)
Ston Adi Antamosane (1977)
Ta 12 Evagelia T'Apostoli (1979)
Den Hriazonte Logia (1982)
Rembetikes Stigmes-Magkika Tragoudia (1983)

1991–1999 (CD Albums)
Mia Vradia Me Ton Apostoli Live (1991)
Ti Mou Thimises Tora (1996)
Na Haro Magkia (1997)
Magkia Mou Poume PAOKtzis (Single) (1998)
Allagi Frouras (1999)

Posthumous CD Releases
Ta Rembetika T' Apostoli – 3CD Collectors' Set (2002)
Gi Afto Ke Zo – 11 Unreleased Tracks (2005)
O Gialinos Kosmos – Remastered Collector's Edition (2007)

Film and television

References

External links
Official website
Rebetika Revival – The Essential 10 Albums, Maria Lord, Songlines #137, 11 October 2018
This Past Week in History – June 30th to July 6th, The National Herald, 8 July 2019
Τα έξι άγνωστα «ευαγγέλια» του Απόστολου Νικολαΐδη (Apostolos Nikolaidis’ six unknown ‘gospels’), Ogdoo.gr, 20 August 2019
Apostolos Nikolaidis on Spotify

1938 births
1999 deaths
20th-century Greek male singers
Greek laïko singers
Greek rebetiko singers
Musicians from Thessaloniki
Singers from Thessaloniki